Justina Taylor Miles is an American Sign Language (ASL) interpreter and performer. She became the first Deaf woman to perform American Sign Language at the Super Bowl pre-game and halftime shows.

Career

Deaf Performer 
She has signed for various live music events, such as the Super Bowl LVII halftime show and pre-show. Her performance at the halftime show was the first ever by a Black Deaf woman and went viral with millions of views on social media. Her performance in ASL of Lil' Kim's "Crush on You" also went viral on TikTok in 2020.

Sport 
She is also an Olympic athlete. She was part of Team USA at the Caxias do Sul 2022 Deaflympics in Brazil, where she received a silver medal for 4x100m women's relay. She also competed in the 100m and 200m events.

Personal life 
She is from Philadelphia.

References

External links 

Living people
2002 births
American Sign Language interpreters
21st-century American women
American female track and field athletes
Deaflympic athletes (track and field)
Deaf competitors in athletics